Mariette Lydis (1887–1970) was an Austrian-Argentine painter. Lydis was born in Vienna, Austria on August 24, 1887, under the name Marietta Ronsperger. She was the third child of Jewish merchants, Franz Ronsperger and Eugenia Fischer, and the sister of Richard and Edith Ronsperger, creator of Opera books who later died by suicide. Mariette first married Julius Koloman Pachoffer-Karñy in 1910. She eventually divorced Julius and married Jean Lydis in 1918 to whom she remained married until 1925. In 1928 she married Giuseppe Govone, an art publisher, and formally remained married to him until his death in 1948. However, at the end of the 30s she escaped Paris and the ensuing Nazi roundup of Jews to be briefly in England and from 1940 in Argentina. From 1940 until her death in 1970 she lived in Argentina, with her partner Erica Marx. Lydis lived openly as bisexual. She is best known for her book illustrations and paintings. Mariette died on April 26, 1970, and rests in the Recoleta Cemetery in Buenos Aires.

Biography

Early life 
Mariette Lydis (born Marietta Ronsperger) was born in Baden, Vienna, Austria on August 24, 1887. She was the daughter of Franz Ronsperger and Eugenia Fischer and had two siblings: Richard and Edith Ronsperger (creator of Opera books). According to her coworker and friend, Béla Balázs, Lydis did not like to discuss her personal family life, although it can be verified that the Ronsperger family was wealthy and that Lydis had a close relationship to her mother, Eugenia. Edith committed suicide in Florence in 1921 and her death had a profound effect on Lydis's life and art.

Career 
Mariette Lydis started her art career as a young self-taught artist who got her start in the art world after traveling to France with Bontempelli in 1925, where she entered the art circles of Paris. Soon she developed a reputation as a talented painter and illustrator. Her first recorded illustration was that of The Cloak of Dreams by Béla Balázs.  Additionally, Lydis illustrated Le Petit Jésus by Joseph Delteil. Later “she became a member of the Salon d’Autonne and held a solo exhibit at the Galerie Bernheim” and continued to illustrate books by many authors including Henry de Montherlant, Paul Valéry, Pierre Louÿs, Paul Verlaine, and Jules Supervielle. These works cemented her as an up-and-coming avant-garde artist and gave her name recognition for her future works. During World War II, Mariette Lydis fled Paris and, unable to exhibit her work, had a gap period where she prepared an exhibit intended to be held in Buenos Aires. She ended up staying in Buenos Aires for the majority of the 1940s, working with her then-husband Giuseppe Govone to publish some of her works, including Le Trefle a Quatre Feuilles: Ou La Clef Du Bonheur. In 1948 Mariette returned to France and worked under many French publishers and illustrated works for Guy de Maupassant, Colette, Baudelaire, Rimbaud, Bella Moerel and Henry James. Lydis eventually returned to Buenos Aires due to the political tension of The Cold War and continued to publish art there until her death on April 26, 1970. During her career she had two prominent artist phases, her first being a darker sadder period where she concentrated on portraying poor people, the old men, the dispossessed, the criminals, and the sick. Later on in her life, her work became brighter and she began drawing and painting more women, adolescents, and young children's. Throughout her career she was influenced by the Japanese artist Tsuguharu Fourjita.

Along with her illustrations, Lydis was known for her lithographic depictions celebrating lesbian and bisexual relationships. She illustrated women in the active-passive heterosexual relationship stereotype by portraying one woman with slightly masculine-looking features. Critics of her work in this style often described the illustrations as "perverse" and compared her work to Tamara de Lempicka, a female Polish painter. Joseph Delteil was one of these frequent critics.

Today, her works are displayed in the Victoria and Albert Museum in London, the Fogg Art Museum at Harvard University, and Davidson Galleries in Seattle, Washington.

Personal life 
Mariette Lydis first married Julius Koloman Pachoffer-Karñy in 1910. Her second marriage was to Jean Lydis in 1920, and shortly after, the couple moved to Athens, Greece in 1922. Her second marriage was short-lived, as she left her husband for an affair with Massimo Bontempelli while in Florence (1925), and then with Joseph Delteil in Paris (1928). That same year, she met Count Giuseppe Govone in France, and married him on August 1, 1934. Among other things, Govone was a publisher for a while, and helped produce many of Lydis's works.  They stayed formally married until his death in Milan in 1948. However, already at the end for the 1930s, together with her partner, Erica Marx, she escaped Paris and the ensuing Nazi roundup of Jews. The couple lived for a brief time in Winchcombe, England before sailing as a refugee to Buenos Aires in July 1940. She and Marx lived and worked in Argentina until Lydis' death 1970.
Lydis was also close to the aviator Amelia Earhart.

It has been commonly stated that Lydis lived openly as a bisexual woman.

Legacy 
Lydis never had children. Mariette Lydis operated a workshop where she trained future artists including Estela Pereda.

Her work was included in the 2019 exhibition City Of Women: Female artists in Vienna from 1900 to 1938 at the Österreichische Galerie Belvedere.

Works

Style 
Mariette Lydis was a printmaker who worked primarily in lithographs. Lydis was also a draughtswoman (of detailed technical drawings), illustrator, and painter.  She worked in pencil, watercolor, charcoal, etching, and oil, producing prints, illuminated lithographic illustrations of stories and poetry, hand-colored drypoints, etchings, aquatints, drawings, and paintings. Her works rely heavily on the use of line, emphasizing illustration over decoration.

“[Mariette Lydis's art] represents the feminine outlook [and] gives us a facet of truth as seen by feminine eyes...I know of no artist--male or female--who can render the soul--the most elusive of all human concepts--as convincingly as Mariette Lydis.”

Inspiration 
Lydis drew inspiration from Koran decoration and decorated Korans herself. Much of her portraiture features young women, including the lithograph Les Paradis artificiels (16 works, 1955), the pencil-and-watercolor drawing Iris (1940), and the oil paintings Jeune femme de profil (1933), Portrait de jeune fille (1955), and Jovencita (1950). Lydis also based some of her works, including Les Criminelles, on prisons and condemned French women. She was influenced heavily by the Japanese artist Tsuguharu Foujita, her friend in Montmartre.

Printed illustrations 
Lydis's first published illustration was in The Cloak of Dreams by Béla Balázs, a compilation of Chinese fairy tales. Additionally, five illustrated etchings by Lydis can be found in Le Petit Jésus by Joseph Delteil. Other writers that Mariette Lydis illustrated for include Pedro Miguel Obligado, Henry de Montherland, Paul Valéry, Pierre Louys, Paul Verlaine, and Jules Superveille.  She illustrated Melancholía, one of Obligado's Argentinian books of poems (https://www.todocoleccion.net/libros-segunda-mano-poesia/melancolia-pedro-miguel-obligado-~x47933802).

Publicity 
Mariette Lydis's work appeared in various newspaper and journal articles during her exhibitions, especially at the St. George's Galleries and the Leicester Galleries.  These articles feature reproductions of her lithographic pencil drawings and watercolors.

References

1887 births
1970 deaths
20th-century Austrian painters
20th-century Austrian women artists
Austrian women painters
Austrian emigrants to Argentina
Burials at La Recoleta Cemetery
Artists from Vienna
Jewish emigrants from Austria after the Anschluss
Naturalized citizens of Argentina
Bisexual artists
Austrian LGBT artists
Bisexual women
Austrian erotic artists
Austrian illustrators
Converts to Roman Catholicism from Judaism